Partnerships in Environmental Management for the Seas of East Asia (PEMSEA) is a regional partnership programme implemented by the United Nations Development Programme (UNDP) and executed by the United Nations Office for Project Services (UNOPS). The project, started in 1994, was originally known as Prevention and Management of Marine Pollution in the East Asian Seas (SDS-SEA).

PEMSEA is currently being hosted by the Philippines' Department of Environment and Natural Resources and holds its office in the DENR compound in Quezon City, Philippines.

History
In December 1993, several Integrated Coastal Management (ICM) pilot sites were established, including Xiamen (PR China) and Batangas Bay (Philippines), which helped start efforts in addressing marine pollution problems in the Straits of Malacca and Straits of Singapore; and increasing capacity development in the regions of Cambolia, China, DPR Korea, Indonesia, Philippines, Thailand and Viet Nam. A second phase of the Project, implemented between 1999 and 2007, was supported by the Global Environmental Facility (GEF), focused on building partnerships between stakeholders. The project was renamed to PEMSEA to reflect the new thrust of the programme.

In 2003, participating governments and stakeholders of the organization issued Sustainable Development Strategy for the Seas of East Asia (SDS-SEA) to promote a common vision in the area of sustainable development in the region. In 2007, PEMSEA committed itself to implementing the SDS-SEA as a part of Phase I project (2007-2017). The latest phase's aim is to make PEMSEA a self-sustaining regional operating mechanism.

PEMSEA's areas of work include coastal and ocean governance, natural and man-made hazard prevention and management, habitat protection, restoration and management, water use and supply management, pollution and waste reduction management, as well as food security and livelihood management.

One of the important tasks that PEMSEA assumes is turning the knowledge about regional coastal into action that can improve the status quo. PEMSEA capitalizes on its broad intergovernmental, financial and intellectual resources to come up with the best solutions problems of sustainable coastal management.

East Asian Seas Congress
Every three years, PEMSEA hosts the East Asian Seas Congress that consists of a Ministerial Forum, an International Conference and other events. The conference focuses on tracking progress of SDS-SEA, encourages knowledge exchange and raises important issues regarding coastal management in the region. It also tries to engage private sector in helping develop sustainable financial and business solutions to coastal management problems. The first East Asian Seas Congress was held in December 2003 in Putrajaya, Malaysia. It was organized following the recommendations of the World Summit on Sustainable Development (WSSD) with the goal to improve situation related to coasts and oceans. The following two congresses were held in Haikou City, Hainan Province, PR China, in the year 2006 and in Philippines in the year 2009. The 2012 congress was held with the theme "Building a Blue Economy: Strategy, Opportunities, and Partnerships in the Seas of East Asia" in July 2012 in Changwon City, the Republic of Korea.

National and regional agreements and declarations
The programme was instrumental to the adoption of several national and regional agreements, including:

 Putrajaya Declaration: Brunei Darussalam, Cambodia, PR China, DPR Korea, Indonesia, Japan, Malaysia, Philippines, RO Korea, Singapore, Thailand and Vietnam adopted the Putrajaya Declaration of Regional Cooperation for the Sustainable Development of the Seas of East Asia on 12 December 2003. The declaration formally adopted the SDS-SEA as a regional strategy for the sustainable development of the seas of the region.
 Haikou Partnership Agreement: Signed by the original signatories of the Putrajaya Declaration (with the exception of Brunei Darussalam and Malaysia) and Japan, the agreement established the coordinating and operating mechanisms of the implementation of the SDS-SEA.
 Manila Bay Declaration: Signed in 2001, the declaration is a commitment between the national government and concerned local government units in the Philippines for the implementation of the Manila Bay Coastal Strategy, providing an environmental management framework for Manila Bay and its watersheds.
 Bohai Sea Declaration: Governors of Liaoning, Hebei, Shandong and Tianjin, together with the Administrator of China's State Oceanic Administration signed the Bohai Declaration on Environmental Protection, formally adopting principles, objectives, policy measures and actions to reduce waste and marine pollution across the administrative boundaries of the adjacent coastal municipalities and provinces.
 Executive Order 533 (Philippines): EO533 declared Integrated Coastal Management (ICM) as the national strategy for sustainable development of the country's marine and coastal resources.

Partners and collaborators
PEMSEA's partners include the following countries and organizations:
Country Partners
 Cambodia
 China
 Indonesia
 Japan
 Laos
 North Korea
 Philippines
 South Korea
 Singapore
 Thailand
 Timor-Leste
 Vietnam

Non-Country Partners
 ASEAN Center for Biodiversity
 Conservation International Philippines	
 Coastal Management Center
 IOC Subcommission for the Western Pacific
 International Ocean Institute
 International Environmental Management of Enclosed Coastal Seas Center
 International Union for Conservation of Nature - Asia Regional Office
 Korea Environment Institute
 Korea Maritime Institute
 Korea Ocean Research and Development Institute
 Northwest Pacific Action Plan
 Ocean Policy and Research Foundation
 Oil Spill Response
 Plymouth Marine Laboratory
 Swedish Environmental Secretariat for Asia
 UNDP/GEF Small Grants Programme
 UNEP Global Programme of Action
 UNDP/GEF Yellow Sea LME Project

Collaborators
 Department of Sustainability and Environment, Victoria, Australia
 National Oceanic and Atmospheric Administration, United States Department of Commerce
 Victorian Coastal Council, Victoria, Australia

References

Ocean pollution
International environmental organizations
Organizations based in Manila
International organizations based in Asia